Borderland is a 1922 American silent drama film directed by Paul Powell and written by Beulah Marie Dix. The film stars Agnes Ayres, Milton Sills, Fred Huntley, Bertram Grassby, Casson Ferguson, Ruby Lafayette, and Sylvia Ashton. The film was released on July 20, 1922, by Paramount Pictures. It is not known whether the film currently survives.

Cast 
Agnes Ayres as Spirit / Dora Becket / Edith Wayne
Milton Sills as James Wayne
Fred Huntley as William Beckett
Bertram Grassby as Francis Vincent
Casson Ferguson as Clyde Meredith
Ruby Lafayette as Eileen
Sylvia Ashton as Mrs. Conlon
Frankie Lee as Jimty
Mary Jane Irving as Totty
Dale Fuller as Elly

Production
The working title of the film was Between the Worlds.

References

External links 
 

1922 films
1920s English-language films
Silent American drama films
1922 drama films
Paramount Pictures films
Films directed by Paul Powell (director)
American black-and-white films
American silent feature films
1920s American films